Byalya is a village in Madhugiri Taluk, Tumkur district, Karnataka State in India with the PIN Code 572175

Villages in Tumkur district